Beka is a town and Union Council of Swabi District in the Khyber Pakhtunkhwa of Pakistan. It is part of Lahor Tehsil.

The present-day Beka was founded approximately 300 years ago as a result of the diversion a river, the Indus, which flows through the town..

Institutions and organizations

Government institutions
Government Higher Secondary
 School for Boys.
Government Girls High School
Government Middle School Beka
Government Primary Schools
The Muslim model school Beka

The Nawab Production
The owner of Production YouTube entertainment channel belongs village Beka, Swabi. Nawab Production aims to educate people through media and improve our Pashto culture according to the new age. Mr. Bilal Khan, Umar Farooq, Wisal Khan and Ihsan Khan  are the boards of directors.

Nawab Family
Nawab Ali is the grand son of Nawab Nehmat Khan.He was a predominant landlord and founder of Beka.Nawab Nehmat Khan have now more than 300 grand grand children which are reside in Beka and Beka Dheri.Nawab Ali Khan  family tree with Nawab Nehmat Khan as below.Nawab Nehmat Khan is belong to sub tribe of Yousafzai (Taju Khel). Taju Khel tribe are the landlords and legally owner of most of the land in Swabi District (source@ Title land registry deeds, Swabi)

  Nawab Family Tree			
				
Nawab Nehmat Khan				
         ↓				
Nawab Abdul Rehim Khan				
         ↓
Nawab Majeed Khan				
         ↓				
Jamdad Khan				
         ↓				
Haji Mohabat Khan				
         ↓				
Nawab Ali Khan				
         ↓	                   
Bilal Khan 	     
               Umar Farooq Khan	    Haroon Khan	
Zohaib Khan	
Ahmad Ali Khan

Private institutions
The Muslim Model School Beka
Beka Model school Beka Swabi
Al Hayat School and College

Organizations
Islamic Center for Women
Dar Ul Ollum (Islamic Recitation Institute)
 Salman Tuition Accadmey
 Helping Handz
 Nawab Welfare organization
 Rubi Gul Welfare Organization ( orphanage)
 Beka Welfare Trust
 Bedaar zalmi committee.

References

Taju Khel
 Populated places in Swabi District
 Union Councils of Swabi District
As per the Britannica Encyclopaedia's 11th Edition, Taju Khel or Tajo Khel are the sub tribe of Yousafzai. They live in many parts of Pakistan and India including Kaddi, Zaida, Marghuz, Lahor, Beka, Sala, Haryan in Pakistan and Bhopal, Delhi, Agraa and Pathan Kot in India. Some Taju Khel in Swabi still have strong family terms with their relatives in India. They are the descendants of Doran Khan. Furthur more according to Roshan Khan the author of 'The History of Yousafzai' Taju Khel along with four other brothers came to current swabi roughly around 16th century from Afghan province Kundooz. Currently the estimated population of Taju Khel globally is around 100,000 to 170,000 but these figures are merely speculative and can vary exponentially.

According to a renowned elder and historian of Yaqubi village Taju Khel, Zakarya Khel, Panj Pao and Balar Khel were all brothers along with Taus Khani, Bazid Khel and Ayub Khel. He further believes that all these brother along with their ancestors formed Aba Khel but like all other chaotic and questionable history of Pashtun tribes, this still has long way to get approved and recognized as History.

Beka, Tajukhel Tribe ancestor is Malak Mehmood Khan after that Malak Nooroze, Malak Abdul Ghani, Malak Rizwan, then after that Malak Jahanzaib , Malak Amraiz, Malak Jawed, & Malak Mairaj
Thats it